Mukho station is a railway station in Donghae City in Gangwon Province, South Korea. Mukho station is on the Yeongdong Line, and the Mukhohang Line.

External links
 Mukho Railway Station

Railway stations in Gangwon Province, South Korea
Donghae City
Railway stations opened in 1961